Samuel Atwell (born 6 April 1979) is an Australian actor, producer, writer and director.

Born in Nambour, Queensland, he and his family lived in Indonesia for 6 years before returning to Queensland where he grew up in Brisbane. He has always had a passion for acting and pursued speech and drama courses throughout school. Atwell did some work with Channel 7 at the end of primary school and Children's TV for 'UNICEF', and also completed a short film made for television. In year 11, with the help of teachers and other students, he formed a school-sponsored theatre company that produced plays such as Property of the Clan, All Stops Out and Dags.

Atwell was also credited being the first drama captain in his school's history. After high school he attended Queensland University of Technology where he completed a B.A. in acting and then moved to Sydney after finishing at the age of 20. His credits include City Loop, an independent film completed while he was at the university, The Wayne Manifesto, All Saints, and the Hal McElroy film Mr. Reliable.

Atwell finished a film called Acting Out with Lara Cox before taking up the role of "Kane Phillips" in the soap opera Home and Away. He also played the role of Craig Palmer in another Aussie soap, headLand. In his spare time, Atwell enjoys going to the movies, reading, writing and is trying to produce a short film this year as well as working on his own theatre and film company. He has produced his own plays, including Savage/Love which he co-produced and starred in alongside former Home and Away co-stars Stephanie Chaves-Jacobsen and Leah Pappin.

Atwell recently starred in a TV Pilot entitled 'Call Back' by Australian Writer Kate Toon.

Atwell currently works as a script consultant and producer on the Irish soap Fair City.

References

External links

1979 births
Australian male television actors
Living people
People from Nambour, Queensland
Queensland University of Technology alumni